Austwickia chelonae is a species of bacteria from the family of Dermatophilaceae, which has been isolated from a snapping turtle from Perth Western in Australia. Austwickia is named after the botanist Peter K.C. Austwick.

References

Further reading 
 

Micrococcales
Bacteria described in 1995
Monotypic bacteria genera